Coypel is the name of a French family of painters, including:

 Noël Coypel 1628–1707, 
 Antoine Coypel, 1661–1722, son of Noël
 Charles-Antoine Coypel 1694–1752, son of Antoine
 Noël Nicholas Coypel 1690–1734, son of Noël and half-brother of Antoine